Selatium is a genus of crabs in the family Sesarmidae. They prefer to live in mangrove swamps along the shores of the Indian and western Pacific Oceans.

Species 
 Selatium brockii (de Man, 1887)
 Selatium elongatum (A. Milne-Edwards, 1869)

References 

Crabs